The giant squid's elusive nature and fearsome appearance have long made it a popular subject of legends and folk tales. Its popularity as an image continues today with references and depictions in literature, film, television, and video games.

Often, the giant squid is represented as being in dramatic, evenly matched combat with a sperm whale. This powerful image is no longer considered accurate given the evidence that exists for a simpler predator-prey relationship between whale and squid, with the whale being the predator and the squid the prey, though sucker scars have been seen on sperm whale skin.

Books and comics

(Alphabetical by author)

In Book 27 (The Exposed) of K. A. Applegate's Animorphs book series, Rachel and Tobias morph sperm whales to find a giant squid, and then the rest of the group morphs the one squid to find the Pemalite ship.
Jaws''' author Peter Benchley's novel Beast features a giant squid terrorizing Bermuda. A TV movie (IMDB entry) was also made. However Benchley's description of the Beast (with clawlike teeth in the center of its suckers) more accurately describes the Colossal Squid.The Lost Symbol by Dan Brown includes the body of a giant squid kept in storage at the Smithsonian Institution. At one point the novel's villain viciously drowns a woman in the containers alcohol solution.
Arthur C. Clarke used giant squid in many of his works. In The Deep Range, a squid of exaggerated size is captured and exhibited. In the short story "Big Game Hunt", a device capable of controlling the behavior of invertebrates is used in an attempt to capture and film a giant squid. In Childhood's End, one of the characters stows away on an alien spacecraft by hiding inside a model of a giant squid battling a whale.
A giant squid is a key player in Michael Crichton's novel Sphere, as well as in the film version.
James Bond fights a giant squid in Ian Fleming's book, Dr. No. The scene is absent from the film adaption.
 A giant squid is mentioned in the book Andrew Lost in the Deep by J. C. Greenburg.
H. P. Lovecraft frequently used tentacled, squid-like monsters in his Cthulhu mythos.
The giant squid specimen currently housed in the Darwin Centre at London's Natural History Museum forms a key role in the plot of fantasy author China Miéville's 2010 novel Kraken.
Chapter 59 ("Squid") of Herman Melville's Moby-Dick details the Pequod's encounter with a giant squid.
The creature used by Ozymandias in Alan Moore, Dave Gibbons, and Jim Higgins' comic book series Watchmen resembles the likeness of a squid.
 James Rollins' SIGMA Force Book 4: The Judas Strain (2007) provides detailed descriptions of sightings of schools of giant predatory attacks by Taningia danae squid in the waters off the island of Pusat and graphic descriptions of collaboratortive squid attacks of several characters.
A giant squid also dwells in the lake at Hogwarts in J.K. Rowling's Harry Potter series of books. It seems to be quite friendly towards the students, and sometimes even acts as a lifeguard when they swim or fall in the lake.
A giant squid acts as a minor character in Charles Sheffield's novel The Web Between the Worlds.
 Many giant squids are mentioned in Tentacles, the sequel to Cryptid Hunters, by Roland Smith. The character of E-Wolf is hired to capture a giant squid for the Northwest Zoo and Aquarium. Smith portrays the squids as pack hunters, when in real life they are solitary.
In J.R.R. Tolkien's Lord of the Rings: The Fellowship of the Ring, the Fellowship come up against the Watcher in the Water, a monster that lurks in the waters of the Sirannon, beneath the western walls of Moria. Although Tolkien's description is vague, the creature is frequently depicted as a giant squid or kraken with varying (often exaggerated) numbers of tentacles, and appeared as such in the 2001 film.
The River Moth, which flows through author Jeff VanderMeer's fictional city of Ambergris, is inhabited by giant squid. The city is named after ambergris, a substance secreted by sperm whales.
Captain Nemo's submarine, the Nautilus, fights a band of seven giant squid in Jules Verne's Twenty Thousand Leagues Under the Sea. In the 1954 film adaptation, there was only one giant squid, which was played by a large prop and served as the film's antagonist.
In H. G. Wells' "The Sea Raiders", a voracious swarm of giant squids (of the fictional species Haploteuthis ferox) slay a total of eleven people in boats and even attack a man on shore.
John Wyndham's book The Kraken Wakes depicts an invasion of squid-like aliens.

Film and television

Film
(Chronological)
John Wayne and Ray Milland battle a giant squid in the climax to Cecil B. DeMille's 1943 film Reap the Wild Wind.
Walt Disney's adaptation of 20,000 Leagues Under the Sea (1954 film) features a scene where Capt. Nemo's Nautilus is attacked by a giant squid (that probably mistook it for a sperm whale).
A menacing giant squid briefly appears in the film Voyage to the Bottom of the Sea (1961).
 In the film The Pagemaster (1994), Adventure, looking for a book to help Richard get past his fear of heights, picks out 20000 Leagues Under the Sea and turns to a page with an illustration of a giant squid. Immediately water gushes out of the book, and the giant squid's tentacles slowly emerge, as Richard and Adventure ascend a ladder to escape.The Beast (1996), a film (with William Petersen, Karen Sillas) is about a giant squid terrorizing a Pacific NW Island, based on Peter Benchley's novel.
At the end of the film Rugrats Go Wild (2003), Nigel Thornberry & the Rugrats see a live giant squid.
The title of the film The Squid and the Whale (2005) refers to the popularly imagined combat between sperm whale and giant squid, specifically as depicted in the diorama at New York's American Museum of Natural History, which the main character visits in the last scene of the movie.
A blue, bioluminescent giant squid makes an appearance in the 2016 Disney/Pixar animated film, Finding Dory as a antagonist.

Television
(Alphabetical by series)

The squid becomes a contender in the twelfth episode of Animal Face-Off (2004) against the sperm whale, in which it loses.
The Doctor Who episode "The Power of Kroll" (1978) features a carnivorous monster resembling a giant squid which lives at the bottom of a swampy lake, and is worshipped by the natives despite the fact that it sometimes eats them.
The Giant Squid a.k.a. Doctor Voltrang's Clone Monster made its appearance in Godzilla by Hanna-Barbera in Episode 14: "Calico Clones". When the Calico crew escaped sinister clones of themselves, the scientist responsible for the clones' creation, Doctor Voltrang, sent out his deadly Giant Squid to recapture them. Captain Majors summoned Godzilla, who tied the Squid's tentacles into knots, forcing the Giant Squid to retreat.
In the Family Guy episode "Death Is a Bitch", a giant squid appears as an uninvited and threatening guest in the Griffin home that they choose to "just ignore and pretend it doesn't exist."
In the Free Willy episode "Cephalopod", a giant squid named Goliath is genetically altered by The Machine, and sent to catch and devour Willy the orca, his adopted little brother Einstein, the young orphaned dolphin and their human friend Jesse. But in the end, Willy defeats Goliath and foils The Machine's evil plan again.
In the Futurama episode "The Deep South" (2000), Fry and Umbriel cheer at a fight between a sperm whale and a giant squid.
An episode of the TV show Invader Zim which was unaired in the United States, called "Zim Eats Waffles", shows Dib watching Zim battling a "Giant Flesh-Eating Demon Squid" to the disbelief of his colleagues.
In Godzilla: The Series episodes New Family Part 1 and New Family Part 2 Mutant Giant Squids were causing trouble in Jamaica, so H.E.A.T. came to check them out. They were saved by Godzilla (Junior) (who was presumed dead after being attacked by the military in the last episode) and find out that the reported trouble must be coming from a more powerful, super predator which turns out to be Crustaceous Rex.
The giant squid was #3 in the Most Extreme episode, "Body Parts", because it has the largest eyes of any living animal. It was #5 in another episode, "Monster Myths", because it's not a sea monster and can't sink ships.
It is implied that the Squibbon may someday evolve into Earth's next sapient life form.
 In Jonny Quest Episode 18 "Pirates From Below" The Giant Squid a surprise visitor gave Dr. Quest the opportunity to try out the underwater prober's arms. 
 The British show Octonauts also features both giant squid and colossal squid.
 A giant squid appears in the Rocko's Modern Life episode Fish-N-Chumps.  Unlike other depictions of a giant squid, the squid in this episode is very friendly and saved Rocko, Heffer and Filburt in exchange for some cheese.
 A giant squid attacks the ship Alton Brown is working on in the Good Eats episode, Squid Pro Quo 2. The Real Adventures of Jonny Quest (a re-imagining of the franchise in the 90s) featured an entire episode dedicated to the giant squid, although the squids in the episode were as large as buildings.
In The Replacements episode "The Means Justify the Trend" (2006), a giant squid can be seen attacking a submarine.
 In the Scooby-Doo! Mystery Incorporated episode "The Midnight Zone", a giant squid briefly appears when Mystery Incorporated investigate an undersea town in a submarine.
 On the Cartoon Network show The Secret Saturdays, a show about a family of cryptozoologists, the parents (Solomon "Doc" and Drew Saturday) are telling their son, Zak Saturday briefly in one episode about how they spent their last anniversary in the stomach of a Giant Squid. This is impossible, as neither a giant squid nor even a colossal squid can swallow a human whole. 
 In the 1970s cartoon series Super Friends, Superman and Aquaman rescued a cruise ship from a giant squid, which had been enlarged by the scientist Dr Pisces. The giant squid's ink had the effect of instantly enlarging any marine creatures that came into contact with it.
 A giant squid and a colossal squid both made an appearance in Wild Kratts.

Music
(Alphabetical by artist)

Artists
The post-metal band Giant Squid takes its name from the animal.
Deathcore band "Here Comes the Kraken" refers to a giant squid.
The indie group Modest Mouse sold shirts on tour in the year 2001 featuring a giant squid fighting a sperm whale.
The Wizard Rock band "The Giant Squidstravaganza" takes its name from the animal, and its appearance in the Harry Potter series, and sings songs exclusively from the point of view of that specific giant squid, often expressing his love for toast.

Albums
A giant squid fighting a sperm whale in space is shown on the album cover of They Might Be Giants' Apollo 18 (1992).

Songs
Scottish pirate metal band Alestorm has a song on their album Back Through Time (2011) called "Death Throes of the Terrorsquid", about a band of pirates fighting a giant squid. The song is actually a sort-of continuation of a previous song called "Leviathan" from their Black Sails at Midnight (2008) album.
The artist "Allergic to Shellfishness" has written and recorded a song "The Great Vampire Squid"
Australian songwriter Baterz wrote and recorded a humorous ballad entitled "Giant squids" in which he speculated that the animals "have a much better time than we do".
Folk Rock Singer/Songwriter Jonathan Coulton's EP Where Tradition Meets Tomorrow includes a song, "I Crush Everything," about a remorseful giant squid.
Metal band "Engorged" have a song entitled "Architeuthis" from the album Where Monsters Dwell.Squid in general - and giant squid in particular - are mentioned in several songs written by Robyn Hitchcock, notably the Soft Boys' song Underwater MoonlightA song by the heavy metal group "Tourniquet" titled "Architeuthis" is about the mysteries of the giant squid.
"Mary The One-Eyed Prostitute Who Fought The Colossal Squid And Saved Us From Certain Death On The High Seas, God Rest Her One-Eyed Soul" is a song from The Dreadnoughts' debut album "Legends Never Die".

Video games
(Alphabetical by game or franchise title)
In Abzû giant squids appear in the chapter 4 of the game.
In Assassin's Creed II and Assassin's Creed IV: Black Flag, encounters with a giant squid appears as an Easter egg in both games. In Assassin's Creed II, Ezio can encounter a giant squid in the Assassin Tomb located under the Santa Maria Delle Visitazione. In Assassin's Creed IV: Black Flag, pirate Edward Kenway can watch a battle between white sperm whale and a giant squid while diving on the Antocha Wreck from the window of a wrecked ship.
In BioShock, when entering the fictional city Rapture aboard an underwater elevator, a giant squid can be seen for a fair amount of time before it moves away, either fleeing from the elevator, or from the whale seen almost immediately afterwards. Later in the game, a dead giant squid can be seen in a display case.
In Command & Conquer: Red Alert 2, mind-controlled giant squids are one of the most powerful naval units in the Soviet arsenal.
In Dragon Quest VIII: Journey of the Cursed King, one of the bosses you fight is a giant squid called Khalamari who uses two of its tentacles to act as hand puppets. It has attacked several ships but when it is defeated, Khalamari reveals he is friendly but was brainwashed by Dhoulmagus. After being cured, Khalamari gives you a Gold Bracer.
In Endless Ocean for the Wii, a giant squid can be found in the Abyss, along with a Sperm Whale. Being a non-violent game, the giant squid will not hurt you and the sperm whale will not attack the giant squid. In its sequel Endless Ocean 2: Adventures of the Deep, however, the giant squid is too dangerous to continue the quest and the only way to proceed is to lure a sperm whale to fight it while you find the mini-sub.
In the game "Jaws Unleashed", the shark encounters a Colossal squid in a level called "the Deep". Juvenile Colossal Squid can be encountered in free roam mode.
In Kirby's Epic Yarn, the boss Capamari is what first appears to be a giant squid wearing a knit cap, but he then turns out to be an octopus.
A giant squid is the boss of a level for Super Adventure Island II.  To defeat it, you must attack its tentacle while the body is out of the water then attack the body.  Defeating it gives you the Moon Stone.
In the Mario franchise, large squid-like monsters called "Bloopers" are common enemies of the video game character Mario. In a few games giant Bloopers serve as bosses. 
In Super Mario RPG, the first boss of the sunken ship is a giant squid that goes by the name, King Calamari. Log from the former crew revealed the squid attacked the ship and the trapped it in the treasure room while the ship sank. It is capable of speech and when its mind is read, King Calamari states that the ship is his. It has 800 Hit Points and its left tentacles have 200 Hit Points while its right tentacles have 260.
In the Dreamcast game Skies of Arcadia, the main character fights (in a ship battle) a giant squid named Obispo.
In Sly 3: Honor Among Thieves, Sly and the gang attempt to subdue the legendary giant squid known as "Crusher" in order for them to defeat Blood Bath Bay's main antagonist, Captain Lefwee. After an arduous battle between Crusher and Sly's crew aboard a pirate ship of their own, they are able to subdue the giant creature and possess its mind with the help of The Guru for use in their operation.
In the game Soulcalibur III, the character Nightmare gains a "giant" squid as his joke weapon.
In Stranded Deep, the most powerful boss in the game, Lusca The Great is a giant squid.
In Super Metroid, the boss character Phantoon resembles a giant squid, as well as the Ozymandias squid creature from the comic series Watchmen.
In Void Bastards, "junk squids" are a species of omnivorous giant squids capable of surviving in hard vacuum and large enough to devour even sizeable spacecraft. 
In World of Warcraft, the final boss in the Throne of the Tides dungeon is a giant squid called Ozumat.  Its model has since been used in Mists of Pandaria as a quest enemy and a dying one can be seen in the Isle of Thunder.
In the fighting game X-Men: Children of the Atom'', a giant squid is visible in the background in Omega Red's stage.

Statues and sculptures
The House on the Rock in Spring Green, Wisconsin has an enormous sculpture of a giant squid and sperm whale battling.
A thirteen meter giant statue was constructed in the Japanese fishing town of Noto in 2021. The purpose of the statue was to attract tourists to the town, although it was widely criticised for being funded with coronavirus relief money.

Miscellany
The Lego Aqua Raiders "Aquabase Invasion" set is centered on a giant squid.

See also
Kraken
Kraken in popular culture
Cephalopods in popular culture
List of squid-faced humanoids

References

Giant squid
Cephalopods in popular culture
Marine life in popular culture
Fictional squid